Corcelles-les-Monts is a commune in the Côte-d'Or department in eastern France.

Population

See also
Communes of the Côte-d'Or department

References

External links

www.corcelles-les-monts.fr Official site

Communes of Côte-d'Or